Pasquale 'Patsy' Caggiano (August 31, 1909 – April 13, 1972) was a Massachusetts politician who served as a member of the Massachusetts House of Representatives and as an At Large City Councilor and the 49th Mayor of Lynn, Massachusetts.

Caggiano was orphaned as a child, and went into the mortuary business, opening up a funeral parlor in Winthrop.

Caggiano served on the Lynn City Council from 1950 to 1951. From 1952 to 1957 he was a member of the Massachusetts House of Representatives. In 1956 he ran for United States House of Representatives seat in Massachusetts's 7th congressional district, losing in the Democratic primary. In 1958 Caggiano was appointed associate commissioner of labor and industries by Governor Foster Furcolo.

Caggiano ran for lieutenant governor in 1960 and 1962, but was ruled off of the ballot in 1962 due to 127 "not genuine" signatures. In 1964 he was an unsuccessful candidate for Governor of Massachusetts. In 1968 he lost in the Massachusetts House of Representatives election in the 12th Essex District.

Cagiano was finally elected mayor of Lynn on his seventh attempt, however shortly after he became mayor he died of cancer.

See also
 1953–1954 Massachusetts legislature
 1955–1956 Massachusetts legislature

Notes

1909 births
1972 deaths
Massachusetts city council members
Democratic Party members of the Massachusetts House of Representatives
Mayors of Lynn, Massachusetts
20th-century American politicians